The Australian Athletics Tour, formerly the Athletics Grand Prix Series is a series of annual Australian track and field competitions which is held from February to April. Australian athletes aiming at selection in the Olympic Games, World Championships or Commonwealth Games are usually required to compete in the meetings which form the series.

Overview

Each year, Athletics Australia and its member associations conduct a range of athletics meets held around the country in a two-tiered structure. Australian Athletics Tour is part of the Athletics Australia National Athletics Series from November to April, which includes meetings, like the Hunter Track Classic in Newcastle, Briggs Athletics Classic in Hobart, Canberra Track Classic, Adelaide Track Classic, Melbourne Track Classic, Perth Track Classic, Sydney Track Classic and Queensland Track Classic in Brisbane.

From 2005 to 2009, the Melbourne Track Classic was part of the prestigious IAAF World Athletics Tour, at which competing athletes can earn points towards competing in the IAAF World Athletics Final. From 2010 to 2016 the meet is part of the IAAF World Challenge.

In 2017, Athletics Australia cancelled the entire tour in favor of a Nitro Athletics event in Melbourne from 4–11 February. NSW Athletics continued both events regardless of their inclusion in the tour. Canberra looks to also get a national event with a "summer of athletics grand prix".

IAAF World Athletics Tour meets

The three IAAF approved meetings held in Australia are:

 Canberra AIS meet - traditionally conducted around Australia Day, 26 January
 Sydney Track Classic - usually conducted in late February
 Melbourne Track Classic - traditionally conducted in late February

The Australian Championships are held shortly after the conclusion of the Grand Prix series.

The Grand Prix series is usually telecast on SBS Television.

Event sponsorship
The series has previously been supported by Athletics Australia's major sponsor and known as:
 Mobil Grand Prix series
 Optus Grand Prix series
 Telstra A-Series
 Qantas Australian Athletics Tour

Telstra's support for athletics in Australia ended in 2007 and the sport was without a major sponsor during the 2008 series.

References

Annual athletics series
Athletics competitions in Australia